"Blueming" is a song by South Korean singer-songwriter IU, serving as the second single from her seventh Korean-language extended play (EP) Love Poem. It was released on November 18, 2019, through Kakao M, and was co-written by IU, Lee Jong-hoon and Lee Chae-kyu, with production handled by the latter two. Lyrically, the song expresses the sentiments of what it means to live and love in modern-day society.

Commercially, the song was a success in South Korea, topping the Gaon Digital Chart and became her 15th number-one single and 22nd number-one song overall. Additionally, "Blueming" achieved the number one position on the Billboard K-pop Hot 100 and ranked number five on the year-end Gaon Digital Chart for 2020. It won the Digital Daesang award at the 35th Golden Disc Awards in January 2021.

Background
"Blueming" was released for digital download and streaming as the second single off of IU's seventh Korean-language extended play, titled Love Poem, on November 18, 2019. It was released through various music portals, including iTunes, in conjunction with the release of the EP. The song was written and composed by IU along with Lee Jong-hoon and Lee Chae-kyu, who had both worked on the composition for IU's 2015 song "Twenty-Three".

Music and lyrics
Musically, "Blueming" is composed in the key of C major with a tempo of 106 beats per minute, and has a runtime of 3:37. A vivacious pop-rock number, it continues her color-oriented lyrics featured in her previous albums Chat-Shire (2015) and Palette (2017). Lyrically, the songwriting explores the themes of everyday anxieties of modern-day romance in an increasingly online and technological world, and how she has come "into bloom" with an unattainable relationship and her personal life. Tamar Herman of Billboard analyzed the song's lyrical message by writing, "IU sings calmly in an upbeat manner about the blue-ming emotions of sending small flower-like texts to the object of her affection, [...] creating a song that is a perfect representation of what it means to live and love at the end of a decade that has seen lives turned upside-down due to the impact of social media and technology."

Commercial performance
The song debuted at number one on the Gaon Digital Chart, becoming IU's 15th number one single and 22nd number-one song overall in South Korea, further extending her record for the most number one songs out of any South Korean artist. In addition, "Blueming" achieved the number-one spot on the Billboard K-pop Hot 100, becoming her eleventh number-one single on the Korean Billboard chart. More than a year later, the song maintained its position as one of the best performing singles in the country, ranking at number five on the year-end Gaon Digital Chart for 2020. In the United States, the song peaked at number 10 on the US World Digital Song Sales chart in the week of November 29, 2019.

Promotion
The official music video for "Blueming" was uploaded to the YouTube channel of 1theK, a brand under Kakao M, simultaneously with the release of the single on November 18, 2019. As of December 2022, the music video has garnered over 153 million views on YouTube. To promote the song, IU performed "Blueming" on her 2019 IU Tour Concert "Love, Poem", which spanned 15 shows across East and Southeast Asia throughout November and December 2019.

Accolades

Chart performance

Weekly charts

Year-end charts

Certifications

Release history

References 

2019 songs
2019 singles
Electro songs
Korean-language songs
IU (singer) songs
South Korean rock songs
Gaon Digital Chart number-one singles
Billboard Korea K-Pop number-one singles
Songs written by IU (singer)